Anto Grgić (born 28 November 1996) is a Swiss professional footballer who plays as a midfielder for FC Sion.

Club career
On 13 July 2016, Grgić moved to VfB Stuttgart and signed a contract until June 2020 with the German club.

On 11 January 2018, he was loaned out to FC Sion until June 2019.

In May 2019, Sion announced the permanent signing of Grgić from Stuttgart on a contract until 2022.

International career
Grgić was born in Switzerland and is of Croatian descent. He is a youth international for Switzerland.

Career statistics

Honours
FC Zürich
 Swiss Cup: 2015–16

References

External links
 

1996 births
Living people
People from Schlieren, Switzerland
Association football midfielders
Swiss men's footballers
Swiss expatriate footballers
Switzerland youth international footballers
Switzerland under-21 international footballers
Swiss people of Croatian descent
Swiss Super League players
FC Zürich players
VfB Stuttgart players
FC Sion players
Bundesliga players
2. Bundesliga players
Regionalliga players
Expatriate footballers in Germany
Swiss expatriate sportspeople in Germany
Sportspeople from the canton of Zürich